Raúl Alfonso Sáenz Meraz (1910-1982) is a Mexican business man, known in the north of Mexico in the decades of 1930s and 1940s especially in the states of Chihuahua and Durango, for having been the first owner of a Coca-Cola bottling plant in Mexico, in the city of Nuevo Casas Grandes, in Chihuahua state, bringing a source of income to an area of Mexico that was undergoing economical withdrawal. He was a very active entrepreneur of his time, acquiring magnesium mines scattered in Sierra Tarahumara, which provided more than 5,000 men with a job, in a time where it was very scarce. The wages paid in his mines were higher than most other places, earning himself a good reputation for being humane in a time where the rich weren't concerned about the lower classes. He also brought the first TV antenna to Chihuahua state, transmitting only stations from USA, since it was closer to the border than to the existing Mexican TV stations of the time, which were in Mexico City.

Raúl Saenz married Maria Eustolia Nevarez, a young girl from a positioned family, and together they gave birth to 11 children, from which the three first were Armando, Rodolfo and Javier. They had only two daughters, Teresa and Maria del Socorro.

The Saenz Nevarez family was known for having the first gadgets and commodities of the time in northern Mexico, such as a TV, a washing machine, an electric iron, or a fridge. People from all social levels were welcomed inside their house to take a look at the new technology brought to town by Mr Saenz.
They earned the care of the peasants and bourgeoise alike, and soon their last name became a signature of wealth and prosperity. Raúl Saenz's offspring were all studying in Jesuit boarding schools, which back then was a kind of education only accessible to the rich, and it was believed to be the best. Raul then was at the peak of his success, he had amounted a large fortune, so he felt it safe to sell some his business to put weight off his shoulders. Among those business, he sold the bottling plant, and half of the mines. Little did he know it was going to be his downfall. Business started to become weaker and weaker in the 1960s and by the early 1980s most of his wealth was in the hands of one of his sons, who was then appointed his father's fortune overseer. His name is still remembered all over Chihuahua, especially among the descendants of those of wealthy families in the 1950s. Raul's descendants amount to more than a hundred at this date.

Trivia
His grandson, Raul Saenz   (credited as Raul Saenz), son of Javier Eduardo Saenz, is a prominent defendant of the rights of the Thai community in Reykjavík, Iceland.
He worked for the most important agency for immigrants in the nordic country, Alþjóðahús  as a translator and interpreter, besides his active role on the advancement of the expatriates in Iceland, specially people from Thailand. He had first made himself acquainted with the diplomats at the Royal Thai Embassy in Mexico City. He presently works in the Ministry of Social Affairs and Social Security of Iceland.

1910 births
1982 deaths
20th-century Mexican businesspeople